Taylor Raddysh (born February 18, 1998) is a Canadian professional ice hockey forward for the Chicago Blackhawks of the National Hockey League (NHL). Raddysh was drafted in the 2016 NHL Entry Draft in the second round (58th) by the Tampa Bay Lightning.

Internationally, Raddysh has represented Canada at the 2018 World Junior Ice Hockey Championships where he won a gold medal.

Playing career
Raddysh was drafted 19th overall by the Erie Otters of the Ontario Hockey League (OHL) in the 2014 OHL Draft.

In the 2016–17 season, Raddysh helped the Otters to their second J. Ross Robertson Cup in franchise history, scoring 109 points in just 58 regular season games. Raddysh was named a Third Team All-Star at the conclusion of the season. On May 15, 2017, Raddysh was signed to a three-year, entry level contract with the Tampa Bay Lightning.

On January 6, 2018, Raddysh along with Detroit Red Wings prospect Jordan Sambrook were traded to the Sault Ste. Marie Greyhounds in exchange for Hayden Fowler and nine draft picks. Following the 2017–18 season, Raddysh participated at the Lightning's 2018–19 training camp. He was reassigned to the Lightning's American Hockey League affiliate, the Syracuse Crunch, on September 23. On December 28, 2018, in a game against the Utica Comets, he recorded 5 assists in a 10–0 Crunch win. His 46 points (18 goals, 28 assists) helped lead the Crunch to a division title.

On April 19, 2021, Raddysh was named the CCM/AHL Player of the Week for the period ending April 18, 2021. He scored three goals and added three assists in three games, including scoring his first career shorthanded goal.

On October 13, 2021, Raddysh made his NHL debut with the Tampa Bay Lightning against the Pittsburgh Penguins at Amalie Arena. On November 1, 2021, Raddysh recorded his first career NHL assist and point. On December 4, 2021, Raddysh recorded his first career NHL goal in a 3-2 Lightning OT win over the Boston Bruins at TD Garden. Raddysh was the 5th player in Lightning history to score a shorthanded goal as their first career goal. 

On March 18, 2022, the Lightning, looking to bolster their offense for an upcoming playoff run, traded Raddysh along with teammate Boris Katchouk and two first-round picks in 2023 and 2024 to the Chicago Blackhawks in exchange for forward Brandon Hagel and two fourth-round draft picks.

International play

Internationally, Raddysh represented Canada at the 2017 World Junior Championships, becoming the 4th player in Team Canada history to score 4 goals in a game against Latvia on December 29, 2016. The following year he returned to Team Canada helping them win a gold at the 2018 World Junior Championships in Buffalo, New York.

Personal life
Raddysh was born and raised in Caledon with his brother Darren. As the two were a few years apart, they played competitive lacrosse on the same teams and golfed together at the Caledon Country Club. Darren is under contract with the Lightning, and made his NHL debut on Dec 30, 2021. He is Ukrainian-Canadian.

Career statistics

Regular season and playoffs

International

Awards & honours

References

External links 

1998 births
Living people
Canadian ice hockey right wingers
Chicago Blackhawks players
Erie Otters players
Ice hockey people from Ontario
People from Caledon, Ontario
Syracuse Crunch players
Tampa Bay Lightning draft picks
Tampa Bay Lightning players